The 1991 Belgian Grand Prix was a Formula One motor race held at Spa-Francorchamps on 25 August 1991. It was the eleventh round of the 1991 Formula One World Championship and the debut race of future 7-time World Champion Michael Schumacher.

Pre-race
The Jordan team dominated the headlines leading up to the Belgian Grand Prix. Driver Bertrand Gachot was serving a two month prison sentence in an English jail as a result of an altercation with a London taxi driver, so the team had decided to replace him with young German driver Michael Schumacher. Elsewhere Johnny Herbert had returned to Lotus after having missed the previous two races due to Formula 3000 commitments in Japan.

Honda had arrived at Spa with updated engines for McLaren, the team hoping to get the momentum back in their favour.

Qualifying

Pre-qualifying report
As at the previous event in Hungary, the Friday morning pre-qualifying session was dominated by Brabham, who achieved their second 1–2 in succession. On this occasion, Martin Brundle was fastest, 1.5 seconds quicker than his team-mate Mark Blundell. Third, over 3.5 seconds slower than Brundle, was Olivier Grouillard for Fondmetal, the fourth time this season he had pre-qualified. Over a second behind Grouillard was Alex Caffi, pre-qualifying for the first time in three attempts for Footwork.

Missing out by 0.45 of a second in fifth place was Caffi's team-mate Michele Alboreto, the first time he had failed to pre-qualify in his three attempts. A fraction slower in sixth, after suffering a huge accident, was Gabriele Tarquini in the AGS, nearly two seconds ahead of Pedro Chaves in the Coloni. Bottom of the time sheets was the other AGS of Fabrizio Barbazza, who also crashed during the session.

Pre-qualifying classification

Qualifying report
Ayrton Senna was fastest most of the weekend and duly took pole position, but Ferrari were right on his heels. Alain Prost qualified third on the road while Jean Alesi had set the fastest first and second sectors only to come across traffic at the end of the lap, resulting in a sixth place start, which would be elevated to fifth. Riccardo Patrese had originally qualified second, but after Saturday qualifying his car was found to not have a reverse gear as per the safety regulations and Patrese's Saturday times were wiped out, he had to start a disappointing seventeenth on the grid. Patrese's misfortune promoted Prost to second, with Nigel Mansell third, Gerhard Berger fourth, Alesi fifth, and Nelson Piquet sixth while the sensation of qualifying, Schumacher, was an amazing seventh for his first Grand Prix. The top ten was completed by Roberto Moreno in the second Benetton, Pierluigi Martini in a Minardi and the ever-impressive Stefano Modena in a Tyrrell.

Qualifying classification

Race

Race report
At the start both Senna and Prost got away well and the Brazilian led into the first corner. Mansell was third followed by Berger, Piquet, and Schumacher. The German's luck however would run dry just after Eau Rouge when his clutch failed. Out at the front Senna continued to lead but Prost's day ended on lap three when his Ferrari caught on fire, leaving Mansell in second. The determined Englishman proceeded to go after Senna and the two battled lap after lap until Senna pitted for new tyres on lap 15. The stop was a bad one and when Mansell pitted two laps later he was able to emerge ahead of Senna, but just behind Berger who had yet to stop. These stops left Piquet in the lead for one lap before he made his stop.

Mansell quickly closed in on Berger and managed to sweep past into Les Fagnes. When Berger stopped a lap later he had problems and then spun on the pit exit and came back right in front of Modena, nearly causing a bad accident. Mansell's big lead would not last, however as on lap 22 his car stopped, having succumbed to electronic problems, his championship hopes taking a major hit.

Mansell's misery was Alesi's jubilation as the young Frenchman took the lead with Senna closing. Senna continued to close until he had a small problem and lost ten seconds, putting him into the clutches of Piquet's Benetton. The Piquet-Senna battle was soon joined by Patrese and de Cesaris, who had been battling over fourth.  Senna led the quartet, but could not pull away because he was suffering from gearbox problems. Alesi had planned to do the entire race without stopping and his strategy was looking very good until lap 30 when his engine expired. This left Senna ahead of Piquet, de Cesaris, and Patrese, who had gone off the track trying to pass Piquet.

On Lap 31 de Cesaris managed to out brake Piquet into Les Combes and was looking good for Jordan's first podium finish in second place. Meanwhile, Patrese got past Piquet as well and set off after the Jordan. In the late stages Berger got past Piquet and then moved into third when Patrese started to suffer from gearbox problems. De Cesaris's fairy tale run ended just three laps from the end when his engine blew, promoting Berger to second and Piquet to third; it was triple World Champion Piquet's final podium of his career. Up front Senna limped home to his second consecutive win despite serious gearbox issues. Moreno was fourth, followed by Patrese and Mark Blundell, who scored Brabham's first point of the year (also the team's best result since Stefano Modena finished fifth in a Judd powered BT58 in the 1990 United States Grand Prix). The Fondmetal team and its driver Olivier Grouillard scored their first finish of 1991.

Race classification

Championship standings after the race
Bold text indicates who still has a theoretical chance of becoming World Champion.

Drivers'  Championship standings

Constructors'   Championship standings

 Note: Only the top five positions are included for both sets of  standings.

References

Belgian Grand Prix
Belgian Grand Prix
Grand Prix
Belgium